Pink Heartz is the debut studio album by American rapper SoFaygo. It was released on November 11, 2022, through Cactus Jack Records. The album features guest appearances from Ken Carson, Lil Uzi Vert, Don Toliver, Gunna, and DJ Khaled.
 
Pink Heartz is supported by four singles that were all released on October 17, 2022, to coincide with the album's release date announcement. The singles are "Hell Yeah" (featuring Ken Carson), "Blitz V2", "Another One", and "Fasho".

Background and promotion
Pink Heartz was first teased by SoFaygo in May 2021 shortly after it was announced that he had signed to Travis Scott's Cactus Jack Records. He would occasionally share snippets and provide additional updates on Instagram Live and his Discord server with his fans over the course of the year, and appeared on both Trippie Redd and labelmate Don Toliver’s albums in August and October 2021 respectively, further building anticipation for the release of his own project. He would release the single "Let's Lose Our Minds" on September 1, 2021, which did not end up being a part of the final album.

After several months with minimal updates and no releases, SoFaygo released the EP B4Pink on June 14, 2022 as a preview to the album, and on the same day he was revealed to be part of the 2022 XXL Freshman Class. On July 15, 2022, SoFaygo confirmed on Instagram Live and in his Discord server that the album was completed.

On September 17, 2022, SoFaygo teased an October release on Instagram. He would in fact release four singles from the album on October 17, 2022, as well as announce the album's official release date as November 11, 2022. A preview for the SoFaygo: Up Next film would also release on Apple Music and YouTube. The lead single “Hell Yeah” featuring Ken Carson was featured in a commercial for Beats by Dre which debuted the same day, starring LeBron James and his son Bronny. On October 19, 2022, in a now edited promotional article, Hypebeast revealed the full track listing for the album, with SoFaygo later confirming the track listing and features the next day during a Twitch stream with Adin Ross.

Track listing

References

2022 debut albums